This is a list of presidents of the Republic of Somaliland, a de facto sovereign state in the Horn of Africa, considered internationally to be part of Somalia. The Republic of Somaliland regards itself as the successor state to British Somaliland, which was independent for a few days in 1960 as the State of Somaliland. The President of Somaliland is the head of state and head of government of Somaliland. The president leads the executive branch of the Government of Somaliland and is the commander-in-chief of the Somaliland Armed Forces. The official residence of the president is the Presidential Palace in Hargeisa.

List of officeholders 

 Political parties

 Other factions

Timeline

Latest election 

On 21 November 2017 the NEC announced that Muse Bihi Abdi of the ruling Kulmiye party polled 55.1% of votes to emerge winner. His closest contender was Abdirahman Irro of the Waddani party who polled 40.7% with Faysal Ali Warabe finishing last with 4.2% of votes.

See also
 President of Somaliland
 Vice President of Somaliland
 Lists of office-holders

References

External links
 World Statesmen – Somalia (Somaliland)

Somaliland
Somaliland-related lists
Government of Somaliland